Alstom APS, also known as Alimentation par Sol or Alimentation Par le Sol (which literally means "feeding via the ground"), is a form of ground-level power supply for street trams and, potentially, other vehicles. APS was developed by Innorail, a subsidiary of Spie Enertrans but was sold to Alstom when Spie was acquired by Amec. It was originally created for the Bordeaux tramway, which was constructed from 2000 and opened in 2003. From 2011, the technology has been used in a number of other cities around the world.

APS is used, primarily for aesthetic reasons, as an alternative to overhead lines. As such it competes with other ground-level power supply systems, but also with energy storage systems such as batteries. In 2015, Alstom developed a derivative of APS, Alstom SRS (Système de Recharge statique par le sol or static-based ground charging system), which can be used to recharge battery powered trams and buses whilst they are stationary at stops. Alstom SRS has been tested for compatibility with snow plows and for safety under exposure to snow, ice, salting, and saturated brine.

Technology 
APS uses a third rail placed between the running rails, divided electrically into 11-meter  segments. These segments automatically switch on and off according to whether a tram is passing over them, thereby eliminating risk to other road users. Each tram has two power collection shoes, next to which are antennas that send radio signals to energise the power rail segments as the tram passes over them. At any one time, two consecutive segments under the tram will be live.

APS is different from the conduit current collection system (which was one of the first ways of supplying power to a tram system) as the latter involves burying a third and fourth rail in an underground conduit (‘vault’) between the running rails. Conduit current collection was used in historic tram systems in Washington, Manhattan, Paris, Berlin, Marseilles, Vienna, Budapest and London. It fell into disuse because overhead wires proved much less expensive and troublesome for street railways.

Unlike the track-side third rail used by most metro trains and some main-line railways, APS poses no danger to people or animals and so can be used in pedestrian areas and city streets.

Uses

Bordeaux 

Modern ground-level current collection was pioneered by the Bordeaux tramway in France. The public had assumed that the new system would use a traditional conduit system, like that of the Bordeaux trams which ran prior to 1958 and objected when they learned that it was not considered safe and that overhead wires were to be used instead. Facing complaints both from the public and the French Ministry of Culture, planners developed APS as a modern way of replicating the conduit system.

Bordeaux Alstom Citadis trams use pantographs and electric overhead lines in outlying areas.

Before use in Bordeaux, APS was tested and proved viable on a short section of reserved-track in the French city of Marseille. Nevertheless, Bordeaux has experienced problems, with APS being so temperamental that, at one stage, the Mayor issued an ultimatum that if reliability could not be guaranteed, it would have to be replaced with overhead wires.

Problems have included water-logging, when the water does not drain quickly enough after heavy rain.

Other cities

Standardization 
Alstom, Elonroad, and other companies have, in 2020, begun drafting a standard for ground-level power supply electric roads. A working group of the French Ministry of Ecology considers rail ground-level power supply technology the most likely candidate for electric roads. The first standard for electrical equipment on-board a vehicle powered by a rail electric road system (ERS), CENELEC Technical Standard 50717, has been approved in late 2022. Following standards, encompassing "full interoperability" and a "unified and interoperable solution" for ground-level power supply, are scheduled to be published by the end 2024, detailing complete "specifications for communication and power supply through conductive rails embedded in the road".

References 

Alstom
Electric rail transport
Tram technology